Ramna Park (Rômna Uddan) is a large park and recreation area situated at the heart of Dhaka, the capital city of Bangladesh. This forested park with pond near its center is one of the most beautiful areas in Dhaka. Islamabad's diplomatic district is named Ramna as a tribute to Ramna Park. This dates from when Bangladesh was East Pakistan and the newly established capital of Pakistan, Islamabad, was divided into various sectors named after various provinces such as Shalimar depicting Punjab and Ramna Bengal.

History

17th century
The history of Ramna starts about 1610 CE during Mughal rule, when the city of Dhaka was founded by Subehdar Islam Khan under Emperor Jahangir.  At that time two beautiful residential areas were developed in the northern suburb of Dhaka city. New residential houses, gardens, mosques, tombs and temples were built in this area during that period. After the fall of the Mughal rule, Ramna gradually lost much of its glory. Ramna was then a barren area with bushes, abandoned or dilapidated buildings, tombs and old temples.

19th century
Ramna area began to regain its glory since 1825, when Mr. Dowes, a British collector of Dhaka initiated a series of steps for development of the city. Engaging convicts, he cleared up the bushes and demolished most tombs and monuments except the Ramna Kali Mandir. The old mosque and tomb that now stand by the western side of old High Court building were spared. The renovated area was given the name of Ramna Green and was fenced by a boundary for using it as a race course. In 1908 he began the work of a garden that took 20 years to take a shape.

The Nawabs of Dhaka developed the racecourse area as a beautiful garden and named a part of it as Shahbagh, the royal garden. The Nawabs also set up a zoo at Ramna. In 1851, the European civil servants established the Dhaka Club on the northern corner of the racecourse and after the Partition a good number of beautiful residential houses were built at Minto road area for the High Court judges and top bureaucrats.

20th century
After creation of Pakistan in 1947, Ramna area continued to occupy an important place in the history of Dhaka city. A new road from Shahbagh to the Eden Building was constructed, and the eastern side of the road was developed as the Ramna Park. A miniature zoo with a few animals and different kinds of birds was left there, at the northeastern side of the present Supreme Court of Bangladesh building and was later moved to the present location at Mirpur.

The large open spaces on the southwest facing the lake were used for holding National Fairs and Exhibitions. In 1960, Queen Elizabeth II was accorded a rousing civic reception at the Ramna Park with display of local fireworks. A raised concrete platform was built for the Queen, the remnants of which can still be seen in the park close to the lake.

The present landscape of Ramna Park was designed in 1952 by the Public Works Department of Bangladesh (former C&B Department). The lake was excavated deeper and extended in length. Walkways and garden paths were built in phases as, sections were regraded and replanted. Irrigation of the rare variety of tree saplings was done by tree wells, with deep vertical tubes/watering pipes to encourage roots to grow deeply. A bud-shaped water tower to supply them was built on the park's northern side.

On the night of 25 March 1971, the Pakistani Army launched its violent campaign against the civilian population of Dhaka. The Ramna Kali Mandir and the neighbouring Maa Anandamoyee Ashram were demolished and more than 200 Hindus who had taken refuge inside were massacred.

Present day park
Ramna Park now grows 71 species of flowering trees shrubs, perennials, and annuals, 36 species fruit bearing plant, 33 species medicinal plant and 41 species of forestry and 11 other species. Walkways inside park have been widened and five new gates built for entry from different sides. The park features many beautiful and modern venues for relaxation, which is maintained by the PWD.

Plants and Trees
Nagessorchampa, Sornochampa, Ritha, Corpur, Naglingom, Arjun, Mahua, Kusum, Telsur, Ashok etc.

Bengali new year celebration

The celebration of Bengali new year Pahela Baishakh begins at dawn arranges by the cultural organisation Chhayanaut welcoming the year at Ramna Batamul under the banyan tree in the Ramna Park.

See also
 Ahsan Manzil
 Lalbagh Fort
 Shaheed Minar, Dhaka
 Jatiyo Sangsad Bhaban

References

 

Parks in Dhaka